Menegazzia albida is a species of foliose lichen from South America. It was originally described as Parmelia cincinnata var. albida by Austrian botanist Alexander Zahlbruckner in 1917.

See also
List of Menegazzia species

References

albida
Lichen species
Lichens described in 1917
Lichens of South America
Taxa named by Alexander Zahlbruckner